The North Water is a 2016 novel by English author and academic Ian McGuire. McGuire's focus of study and field of interest is American realist literature which is defined as, "...the faithful representation of reality"  The Guardian reviewer writes, "The strength of The North Water lies in its well-researched detail and persuasive descriptions of the cold, violence, cruelty and the raw, bloody business of whale-killing."  The headline of the Independent Book Review "Ian McGuire, The North Water: 'Subtle as a harpoon in the head, but totally gripping', book review" reinforces the realist aspect of the writing. The North Water was published by Henry Holt and Company (USA) and Simon & Schuster (UK)/Scribner (UK).

Plot 
The north water of the title is the North Water Polynya, to which ships sail in the hunt and kill whales. The novel opens in Hull where the industry is under threat with paraffin and coal oil replacing whale oil. We meet Henry Drax a harpooner who rapes and kills a child, "... a brute, a vacuum into which men and boys are sucked and do not emerge alive". Joining as ships doctor is Irishman Patrick Sumner a disgraced former British army surgeon with a murky past in India.  They set sail on the Volunteer under Captain Brownlee who lost his last ship and crew; in league with the owner Baxter, he intends to scuttle the Volunteer in an insurance scam.

Awards and honours
2016 Man Booker Prize, longlisted.
2016 New York Times 10 Best Books of 2016
2016 Shortlisted  Los Angeles Times Book Prize Mystery/Thriller 
2016 On the Chicago Tribune list of Best Books of the Year
2017  Royal Society of Literature Encore Award

Television adaptation

The North Water  has been adapted into a BBC Two five-part television serial. It premiered on July 15, 2021 on AMC+ (USA). In the UK The North Water will air autumn 2021 on BBC Two and BBC iPlayer. It stars Colin Farrell as Henry Drax, Jack O'Connell as Patrick Sumner, Stephen Graham as Captain Brownlee, and Tom Courtenay as Baxter. Commissioned by the BBC, The North Water is made by See-Saw Films for the BBC and is adapted and directed by Andrew Haigh. Executive producers are Jamie Laurenson, Hakan Kousetta, Iain Canning and Emile Sherman for See-Saw Films, Niv Fichman for Rhombus Media, and Jo McClellan for the BBC. The series was produced by Kate Ogborn. The North Water is distributed internationally by BBC Studios.

References

External links
 

2016 British novels
Whaling
Novels set on ships
British novels adapted into television shows
Charles Scribner's Sons books